The patronym Faye (Serer: Fay) is one of the typical surnames of the Serer people of Senegal, the Gambia and Mauritania. In French-speaking Senegal and Mauritania, and English-speaking Gambia, the surname is spelled Faye.

This Serer surname is unrelated to the similar given name or surname in the Western world. They are also pronounced differently.

The name of their clan is Fayeen. The history of the Faye family is linked to Serer medieval history and Serer royalty. During the Guelowar period (the last maternal dynasty in the Serer kingdoms), the Faye family provided many of the kings of Sine. This family's biggest rival to the throne of Sine were the Joof family, with whom they have a long joking relationship according to Serer and Senegambian culture.

History

The early history of the Faye family goes back to Lamanic times, however they did not achieve particular fame and notoriety until the 14th century. The Faye family that had ruled the pre-colonial kingdoms of Sine trace descent to Boukar Djillakh Faye (variation: Bougar Birame Faye), an early 14th-century professional wrestler called njom in Serer and patriarch of this patriclan. In the early 14th century, Boukar Djillakh Faye was regarded as one of the best wrestlers in Serer country. The Guelowar princess Lingeer Tening Jom was given to him in marriage. From that marriage, they had several children including Tasse Faye (or Tassé Faye, the first from this family to rule Sine as Maad a Sinig during this era) and Waagaan Tening Jom Faye (the king with at least 24 children including 9 daughters) — one of the better known kings from this family. Dinned into Senegambian and Serer history, the Faye family, like their Joof counterparts are one of few Senegambian families that have a family anthem (boom). The name of their anthem is "Waagaan Koumbassandiane", (proper: Waagaan Kumbasaanjaan) who actually was a medieval king of Sine (Maad a Sinig Waagaan Kumbasaanjaan Faye) reported to be one of the longest reigning kings of Sine and ancestor of this family. This family's anthem forms part of the overture of the Epic of Sanmoon Faye, which relates the history and deeds of Maad a Sinig Sanmoon Faye, the controversial king of Sine who succeeded Maad a Sinig Kumba Ndoffene Famak Joof in 1871. Their family totem is the African warthog (called "ruul a koб" in Serer, variation: "ruul-a-koƥ") — (previously grouped with the boar). In the early part of the Guelowar dynastic period (1350–1969), the Faye paternal dynasty was dominant in Sine, providing many of the Serer kings. However they were eventually overtaken by the Joof family who provided more kings of Sine, even from the 19th century to 1969. Notwithstanding the rivalries between these two patriclans, alliances were formed on certain occasions in order to repulse those they perceived as the greater enemy. One of these medieval alliances was between Maad a Sinig Diessanou Faye and Jaraff Boureh Gnilane Joof (founder of the Royal House of Boureh Gnilane Joof). That historical alliance was brought about when the Muslim marabout—Mohammadou of Koungo launched jihad in the Sine, threatening the survival of Serer religion in the country. Diessanou Faye, who was on the throne of Sine requested the assistance of the Joof family. Assistance was granted, with the Joof clan led by Boureh Gnilane Joof (son of the warlord king of Laah and conqueror of Baol - Maad Patar Kholleh Joof). The Joof—Faye alliance led to the defeat the Muslim army. For his part in achieving victory, Boureh Gnilane was made Jaraff (equivalent of prime minister) and given the sister of Diessanou Faye (Lingeer Gnilane Faye) in marriage.

Historical battles involving this family
The table below lists some historical battles in Senegambia involving the kings or princes from this patriclan : 
[[image:Serer Royal War Drum (Jung-Jung). 19th Century. Jung-Jung From The Kingdom of Sine (in modern day Senegal).jpg|thumb|left|upright|The Junjung: the Serer war drum of Sine (19th century)<ref>Faye, Louis Diène, Mort et naissance: le monde Sereer, Nouvelles éditions africaines, 1983, p. 56 </ref>]]

Genealogy
This abbreviated genealogy shows the descendants of Boukar Djillakh Faye.
Descendants of Boukar Djillakh Faye

                                      Boukar Djillakh Faye    = Lingeer Tening Jom
                                      of Djillakh (Dieghem)   │    queen mother
           ___│_
          │                                      │                              │                       │
     Maad a Sinig Tasse Faye        Maad a Sinig Waagaan Tening Jom Faye     Mabane Faye         Lingeer Gnilane Faye
    (Maad a Sinig, king of Sine)            (king of Sine)                (prince of Sine)       (princess of Sine)
             reigned 1370                         │
                                                  │__
  ___│_
  │                 │                   │                  │                      │                          │             │
 Mba Waagaan Faye  Ndougou Waagaan Faye Yakis Waagaan Faye Karabel Waagaan Faye   Biram Jakar Waagaan Faye*  Ngom Waagaan  │
                                          ___│                       Faye      │
                                          │                                                                                │
              │       _│
              │                                   │
              │  _│_
    __│ │                 │                       │                         │                 │                 │
    │           │           Khanjang Waagaan Faye    Njein Waagaan Faye      Lassouk Waagaan Faye     Jokel           Koly
    │       Toma Waagaan Faye                                                                         Waagaan Faye    Mbeggaan
    │_                                                                                                Faye
                      │
                      │
    Maad a Sinig Waagaan Kumba Saanjaan Faye
                 (king of Sine)

* It is his name people cite when they make a short praise to the Faye family, i.e. "Fay Biram" which may signify, "Faye! From the line Biram." For the Joof family, it is the name of Maad a Sinig Niokhobai Mane Nyan Joof they recite, i.e. "Juufa Niokhobai Samba Lingeer" (var. Dioufa Niokhobaye), which means "Joof! The great nobles." These short family poems or proverbs are called lastangol la (or ndakantal) in Serer.

Status in Serer religion

The Faye family's involvement in Serer religion is linked to the Pangool (the Serer saints and ancestral spirits). During the reign of Maad a Sinig Waasila Faye (in the fifteenth century), the Fangool Laga Ndong was canonized king of the Pangool (singular: Fangool). Between c. 1750–1763, the then king of Sine — Maad a Sinig Boukar Tjilas Mahe Soum Joof is reported to have come into conflict with the Fangool Tamba Faye (the "great Fangool of  Ndiob").

In Senegambian culture
The Senegalese artist Youssou N'Dour himself of Serer heritage dedicated his 1985 track Wagane Faye to this family. In that song, he recite the genealogy of this family with particularly emphasis on the branch of Waagaan Faye (i.e. Maad a Sinig Waagaan Tening Jom Faye).
Yandé Codou Sène, the late Serer Diva, sings the deeds of Maad a Sinig Waasila Faye in her song Moon and that of Maad a Sinig Sanmoon Faye (also called Salmon Faye) from her 1997 album (Night Sky in Sine Saloum) — Salmon Fay, which she sang in a cappella.

Serer personalities with the surname Faye or Fay
The following list is a sample of those personalities who are ethnically Serers of Senegal, the Gambia and Mauritania pertaining to the Serer patronym Faye or Fay :

Royalty

Kingdom of Sine

 Maad a Sinig Waagaan Tening Jom Faye
 Maad a Sinig Wassyla Faye (or Wassila Faye)
 Maad a Sinig Diessanou Faye
 Lingeer Gnilane Faye, sister of  Maad a Sinig Diessanou Faye and wife of Jaraff Boureh Gnilane Joof
 Maad a Sinig Waagaan Kumbasaanjaan Faye
 Maad a Sinig Laasuk Fanaan Faye
Lingeer-Awo Yandeh Mbouna Faye, first wife of Maad Semou Njekeh Joof (founder of the Royal House of Semou Njekeh Joof). She was princess of Sine later the queen mother.
Lingeer Gnilane Faye, she is the mother of  Maad a Sinig Njaak Faye (from her first marriage) as well as the mother Maad a Sinig Ama Joof Gnilane Faye Joof  (from her second marriage to the warlord Sandigue Ndiob Niokhobaye Joof). This queen mother was highly involved in the political affairs of Sine. The Battle of Ndoffène was a family crisis for Lingeer Gnilane, because it involved her second husband from the family Joof fighting for the succession of their youngest son (Ama Joof) against her eldest son Njaak Faye who was the king of Sine. Maad a Sinig Njaak Faye was defeated and killed in that battle.
 Maad a Sinig Sanmoon Faye (var: Sanoumon Faye, sometimes called Salmon Faye) – reigned 1871–1878 A controversial king regarded as a great warrior king,Klein, pp 106-9 but also viewed by his notables as a wicked king. When his notables headed by the Farba—Mbar Yandé Ndiaye Faye (his general) called his nephew Semou Maak Joof (the future king of Sine whom Sanmoon previously defeated and driven out of Sine) to help them defeat Maad a Sinig Sanmoon Faye, he sought French protection and practically ceded to the French the sovereignty of Sine, though he never kept to the terms of the treaty. There was little support from the French. It was during and after his reign that the Kingdom of Sine was ravaged with dynastic struggles, where the kings succeeded one another at an astounding rate.

Jolof

Lingeer Gnilane Faye (of Sine), she was married off to the Njie royal family of Jolof, some of which later settled in Saloum. Her son Waljojo (or Waldiodio) did become king of Sine.

Academia
 Louis Diène Faye (born 1936), Senegalese scholar of Serer religion and history
Souleymane Faye, Senegalese professor of linguistics and author on Serer and Cangin languages

Politics
 Caroline Faye Diop (1923–1992), a Senegalese politician during the First and Second Republic. Daughter of Diène Faye and wife of Demba Diop (the Senegalese minister).
 Saliou Diodj Faye (1941 - ), a Senegalese ambassador to the United Kingdom (1976 - 1980) and to Canada (1980 - 1986)
 Marieme Faye Sall, the current First Lady of Senegal.

Military
Farba Mbar Yandé Ndiaye Faye, the general and commander of the Sine army during the reign of Maad a Sinig Sanmoon Faye. He wrote a letter to the French in 1876 relaying the cruelty of the king of Sine.
Waly Faye (1933 - 1997), General of the senior army corps commander of the national gendarmerie and director of military justice. Grand Chancellor of the National Order of the Lion
 Mbaye Faye (born 1948), Senegalese field officer and colonel
 Leopold M'Bar Faye: Senegalese field officer and colonel

Art and entertainment
 Safi Faye (born 1943), Senegalese film director and ethnologist
 Abdala Faye (born 1971), Senegalese mixed media artist
 Mbaye Dieye Faye, Senegalese singer and percussionist
 Habib Faye, a Senegalese bassist, keyboardist, composer and grammy-nominated producer

Sport
 Fary Faye (born 1974), Senegalese footballer
 Ibrahima Faye (born 1979), Senegalese footballer
 Maodomalick Faye (born 1987), Senegalese footballer
 Abdoulaye Faye (born 1978), Senegalese football
 Amdy Faye (born 1977), Senegalese football
 Pape Omar Faye (born 1987), Senegalese football
 Mathieu Faye (born 1958), a former Senegalese basketball player
 Mouhammad Faye (born 1985), a Senegalese basketball player
 Gnima Faye (born 1985), a Senegalese track and field athlete
 Khadim Faye (born 1970), a former Senegalese goalkeeper
 Apollo Faye (born 1951), basketball player originally from Senegal
 Ibou Faye (born 1969), Senegalese 400 metres hurdler
 Mareme Faye a Senegalese swimmer

Assassins
 Abdou N'Daffa Faye (died 1967), a reported assassin (o pôbôm in Serer) charged with the assassination of a Senegalese politician in 1967. He was found guilty and sentenced to death.

See also
Maad Saloum
Teigne (title)
Loul
Thilas
Timeline of Serer history

References

Bibliography
Sarr, Alioune, "Histoire du Sine-Saloum", (Sénégal), Introduction, bibliographie et notes par Charles Becker. Version légèrement remaniée par rapport à celle qui est parue en 1986-87
Diouf, Niokhobaye. "Chronique du royaume du Sine", Suivie de notes sur les traditions orales et les sources écrites concernant le royaume du Sine par Charles Becker et Victor Martin. (1972). Bulletin de l'Institut Fondamental d'Afrique Noire, Tome 34, Série B, n° 4, (1972)
Lamoise, LE P., "Grammaire de la langue sérère avec des exemples et des exercises renfermant des documents très utiles", Imprimerie de la Mission (1873)
Muséum national d'histoire naturelle (France). Laboratoire d'ethnobotanique et d'ethnozoologie, Centre national de la recherche scientifique (France), "Journal d'agriculture traditionnelle et de botanique appliquée: JATBA., Volumes 32–33", Laboratoire d'ethnobotanique et d'ethnozoologie, Muséum national d'histoire naturelle (1985), p 233
"L’EPOPEE DE SANMOON FAY", [in] Éthiopiques n°54 revue semestrielle de culture négro-africaine, Nouvelle série volume 7 2e semestre 1991    (Retrieved 14 August 2012)
Fata Ndiaye, "La saga du peuple sérère et l'Histoire du Sine", in Éthiopiques'' revue, numéro 54, vol. 7, 2e semestre 1991   
Gravrand, Henry, "La Civilisation Sereer – Pangool", vol.2, Les Nouvelles Editions Africaines du Senegal, (1990),  
Sarr, Benjamin Sombel, "Sorcellerie et univers religieux chrétien en Afrique", l'Harmattan (2008), p 19, 

Serer royalty
Faye dynasty
Senegalese families
Gambian families
Senegambian families
Serer families
African royal families